Trail blazing or way marking is the practice of marking paths in outdoor recreational areas with signs or markings that follow each other at certain, though not necessarily exactly defined, distances and mark the direction of the trail.

A blaze in the beginning meant "a mark made on a tree by slashing the bark" (The Canadian Oxford Dictionary). Originally a waymark was "any conspicuous object which serves as a guide to travellers; a landmark" (Oxford English Dictionary).

There are several ways of marking trails, including paint, carvings, affixed markers, posts, flagging, cairns, and crosses, with paint being the most widely used.

Types of signage

Paint

A painted marking of a consistent shape or shapes (often rectangular), dimension and colour or combination of colours is used along the trail route. The system by which blazes are used to signify turns and endpoints in trails (see below) strongly favors the use of paint blazes.

 
European countries usually use systems of painted bars or shapes in more than one colour. The Central European Hiking Markers System uses three bars – usually one color in between two white bars, with different meanings attached to different colours – in a 10 cm x 10 cm square. Red is often used to mark difficult or summit trails. Arrows of similar design signal a change of direction. 

This system was first used in today's Czech Republic in May 1889, to mark a trail from the town of Štěchovice to a nearby spring. This system is used also in Slovakia, Poland, Ukraine, Bulgaria, Georgia, Brazil and other countries. French, Italian, Austrian and Swiss trails use a similar system of white and coloured stripes. Slovenia, Croatia and other former members of Yugoslavia use Knafelc trail blaze.

In the United States and Canada, a single colour is used, usually white, red, blue or yellow. Trails in South Africa are often marked by yellow footprints painted on trees and rocks.

Blazes may also be painted on obvious rock surfaces or on posts set into the ground (or on utility poles, fences, or other handy surfaces) where the trail follows a road or goes through fields and meadows.

Carvings
in North America, Australia and New Zealand, there are trails blazed by cuts made in bark by axe or knife, usually the former. Most often these are informal routes made by loggers or hunters, or trails descended from those routes. Originally a tree would be blazed by hatchet chops (still the dictionary definition) but today other methods have become more common, with environmental and aesthetic concerns sometimes playing a part in the choice of blazing method. Other navigational aids, such as cairns, are used where blazes are unsuitable.

In 1902 the miners of Idaho created and marked the Three Blaze "shortcut" Trail with a series of three distinctive blazes cut on the trees, usually with an axe, to define the specific route to the Thunder Mountain Mines of Central Idaho.

Affixed markers

Alternatively, more long lasting plastic, metal or even sometimes wooden markers may be affixed to trees, usually with nails. The placement of these markers requires more skill and labor than paint, as well as an area with an abundant supply of trees to which to attach them.

Flagging

Surveyor's tape hung from branches or tied around trees is sometimes used to indicate trail routes, but usually only for temporary or unofficial trails, most commonly when a trail route has been selected but the trail itself is under construction. Flags are sometimes used for permanent trails, but they are the most vulnerable to the elements of any trail blazing method and may be more difficult to see.

Trail flagging is the predominant method to mark a mountain hiking trail in Japan. Red ribbons usually indicate an ascent route while yellow ribbon indicate a descent route. On some mountains, a non-standard ribbon colour (white or blue) is used to identify a specific trail.

Poles
 Poles, colored or not, are often used to keep the trail visible during winter and under snow cover. Poles are standard trail markers in Austria, Canada, USA, the Czech Republic, Switzerland, and Slovakia.

Cairns

Cairns are carefully arranged piles of stones. Cairns are most commonly used to indicate trails in open areas, such as higher-elevation alpine areas, where no trees are available, or where conditions may make blazes hard to see. An ancient example is the inuksuk (plural inuksuit), used by the Inuit, Inupiat, Kalaallit, Yupik, and other peoples of the Arctic region of North America. These structures are found from Alaska to Greenland. This region, above the Arctic Circle, is dominated by the tundra biome and has areas with few natural landmarks.

Below the tree line, cairns are used less frequently, often like flagging to indicate informal or unofficial paths or just their junctions with official trails. They may become obscured by snow in areas with heavy winters and may be easily knocked over. In some areas the recreational building of numerous cairns has obscured the proper use of cairns to mark junctions and crossings. In some areas of the United States, park rangers and land managers must disassemble excess cairns when they become eyesores or when they mislead navigation.

Where rocks are scarce poles can be used. Poles are also frequently used to mark ski and snow shoe trails.

Trail ducks
Duck is a term used in some parts of the US, generally for a much smaller rock pile than a cairn, typically stacked just high enough to convince the observer it is not natural. For most, two rocks stacked could be a coincidence, but three rocks stacked is a duck. In some regions, ducks also contain a pointer rock (or a couple of stacked rocks) to indicate the direction of the trail.

Crosses
A wayside cross is a cross by a footpath, track or road, at an intersection, along the edge of a field or in a forest, which often serve as waymarks for walkers and pilgrims or designate dangerous places. They are particularly common in Europe, for example in Germany, Galicia and the Alps. It can be made of wood, stone or metal. Most wayside crosses are designed as crucifixes.

Prominence
In US wilderness areas, whether state or federal, the US Wilderness Act requires that the land seems "untrammeled by man," and so blazes are often kept to a minimum. By contrast, in a typical municipal, county, or state park, or any land open to a wide variety of users, or in a well-developed metropolitan area, blazes will be more frequent. Single-track hiking trails also receive more blazes than those that follow old roads or other more obvious routes.

Systems

On a large piece of land, there is likely to be more than one trail. While it might seem obvious that, at minimum, trails should at least take different colours, this is not always done. In Mount Greylock State Reservation, which contains the highest mountain in Massachusetts, all trails other than the Appalachian Trail use the same blue blaze.

Blaze type might also be mixed when different user groups (i.e., snowmobilers, horse riders, mountain bikers) are allowed on trails. For users of faster vehicles, blazes are often larger in order to be seen better at high speeds, and sometimes affixed markers best communicate who may and may not use a trail besides those on foot.

Another possible distinction is by season. In Norway, it is common to use blue for summer routes and red for winter routes. Red routes may traverse lakes and swamps, which are flat and well suited for cross-country skiing in winter, but impassable on foot in summer.

Colours are often assigned simply with an eye toward making sure that no two trails that intersect use the same one, but it can go further than that. On all state land in New York's Catskill Park, for instance, primary trails, especially longer "trunk trails" that go great distances, use red markers if they go in a generally east–west direction and blue if they go north–south. Shorter spur, loop or connector trails generally use yellow blazes.

On occasions when two trails run concurrently, usually at a slightly staggered junction, only one trail may be signed, often with the longer or more heavily trafficked trail's blaze predominating. In other cases, such as southern Vermont where the Appalachian Trail and the Long Trail follow the same path, both trails may use the same white blaze.

A quite different blazing system, called mute blazes was created in the Czech part of the Giant Mountains. The blazes, cut out of sheet metal and painted red, are suspended on high poles, thus being visible to both hikers and skiers. Unlike in classic systems, they do not refer to paths or trails, but show the way to the nearest mountain huts and adjacent towns and villages with the possibility of overnighting and catering.

National Trails in England and Wales generally use an acorn symbol. The National Cycle Network in the United Kingdom is signposted using a white bicycle symbol on a blue background, with a white route number in an inset box, but with no destination names or distances. National Route numbers have a red background, Regional Route numbers have a blue background. The system of symbols is based on that used by the Danish National Cycle Route network.

The colour used may also indicate the status of the route, for example on rights of way in England and Wales yellow marks are used for footpaths, blue for bridleways, and red for byways open to all traffic.

Meaning of trail signs

In addition to reassuring the trail user that they are on the trail, the signage can alert them to imminent turns, particularly if there is some confusion about what might be the trail, and where trails begin and end.

Offset blazes is a system whereby a vertically stacked pair of blazes with the upper one offset in the direction that the trail turns. This system was first used in 1970 on the Beech Trail in Harriman State Park. This system was further refined to where a triangular pattern of blazes would indicate a terminus, its point up or down depending on whether that was the beginning or the end. These began to be used elsewhere and are now fairly common throughout North America, though variations of this system exist. Some trails instead use two blazes painted together at an angle to form an "L" shape to indicate a turn, with the angle between the two blazes indicating the angle and direction of the turn. Also, a few trails indicate turns with two stacked blazes, without an offset, but this can cause confusion as the direction is not implied. In addition, other trails may use two non-offset stacked blazes to indicate the trail goes straight at a location where there may be a tempting mis-turn.

A triangular pattern with its point to the side was also devised for eventualities like spurs or junctions, but these have not caught on.

In some areas, a triangular pattern with its point up indicates that a hiker is at the point of a sharp switchback.

In the Netherlands, signage usually consist of two bars above each other: white-red, yellow-red and red-blue are commonly seen blazes. An upcoming turn is indicated by duplicating the blazes: white-red-white-red, yellow-red-yellow-red, etc. Nowadays, stickers are often used, and instead of duplicating the blaze, the rectangle is cut into an arrow, to indicate direction. A diagonal cross is used to indicate a direction should not be taken: the cross will have the same colours as the blazes (each bar will use a different colour).

See also

 Daymark
 Desire path, a trail created by repeated use, sometimes informally marked
 Land mark
 Quilt Trail
 Sea mark
 Trailhead
 Wayfinding
 Waypoint, a GPS navigation term

References

Hiking
Outdoor recreation
Signage
Trails
Geopositioning markers